Phaedropsis maritzalis is a moth in the family Crambidae. It was described by William Schaus in 1920. It is found in Guatemala, Honduras and Venezuela.

The wingspan is about 29 mm. The wings are bright orange with black markings. There is a subbasal spot on the costa of the forewings, as well as a more remote spot on the inner margin and an antemedial spot on the costa entering the cell as a line. There is an outset vertical line below the cell, and a similar line from vein 1 to the inner margin, as well as a thick line on the discocellular and an outbent postmedial line across the costal margin. On the hindwings, there is a postmedial series of spots.

References

Spilomelinae
Moths described in 1920